Pinguini Tattici Nucleari (English: "Tactical Nuclear Penguins") is an Italian indie rock/pop band formed in 2010.

They debuted in 2012 with the EP Cartoni animali and their first studio album Il re è nudo was released in 2014.

The band participated at the Sanremo Music Festival 2020 with the song "Ringo Starr", getting the 3rd place.

According to members of the band, their name is inspired by Tactical Nuclear Penguin, a beer produced by Scottish brewery Brewdog in 2009.

Discography

Studio albums

Extended plays

Singles

Other charted songs

References

External links 

Musical groups established in 2010
Musical groups from Lombardy
Italian pop music groups
Italian rock music groups
2010 establishments in Italy